Phryganodes biguttata is a moth in the family Crambidae that is found in the Democratic Republic of the Congo, Cameroon and Sierra Leone. The species was first described by George Hampson in 1899.

References
Hampson, G. F. (1899). "A revision of the moths of the subfamily Pyraustinae and family Pyralidae, part 1". Proceedings of the Zoological Society of London. 1898(4):715, pl. 49 (XLIX)–fig.12.

Spilomelinae
Insects of Cameroon
Moths of Africa
Insects of the Democratic Republic of the Congo
Insects of West Africa
Moths described in 1899